Sonic Pi is a live coding environment based on Ruby, originally designed to support both computing and music lessons in schools, developed by Sam Aaron in the University of Cambridge Computer Laboratory in collaboration with Raspberry Pi Foundation.

Uses 

Thanks to its use of the SuperCollider synthesis engine and accurate timing model, it is also used for live coding and other forms of algorithmic music performance and production, including at algoraves. Its research and development has been supported by Nesta, via the Sonic PI: Live & Coding project.

See also 

 Comparison of audio synthesis environments
 Pure Data
 Algorithmic composition
 List of MIDI editors and sequencers
 List of music software

Further reading

References

External links 

 

Digital art
Computer programming
Live coding
Algorave
Free music software
Electronic music software
Free audio software
Free software programmed in Ruby
Audio programming languages
Software synthesizers
Raspberry Pi
University of Cambridge Computer Laboratory